Peligro: sin codificar is a humoristic TV show from Argentina. It began in 2008 in América TV, and then moved to Telefe.

Awards
 2013 Martín Fierro Awards
 Best humoristic program
 2014 Martín Fierro Awards
 Best humoristic program
 2015 Martín Fierro Awards
 Best humoristic program

References

External links
 
 

Telefe original programming
América TV original programming
2008 Argentine television series debuts
2015 Argentine television series endings